Populus adenopoda, known commonly as the Chinese aspen, is a species of poplar found in the subtropical regions of China. The trees can reach a maximum height of 30 metres, and occur on mountain slopes at elevations of 300–2500 metres. Wood from the trees is used in construction and furniture production, as well as timber, farm tools, and wood pulp.

Varieties 
 Populus adenopoda var. adenopoda
 Populus adenopoda var. platyphylla C. Wang & S. L. Tung

References

External links

adenopoda
Flora of China